"Switch It On" is a song by English singer Will Young. It was written by Young, Stephen Lipson, Ronnie Peterson, Karen Poole and Steven Wolf, and produced by Lipson for third studio album, Keep On (2005). The song was released as the album's first single on 14 November 2005, a week before the album. The single reached number five in the UK Singles Chart. The music itself is based on a guitar Bo Diddley riff similar to The Count 5's Psychotic Reaction.

Music video
The video for "Switch It On" was directed by Vaughan Arnell and filmed at Thunder City in Cape Town, South Africa. It is based on the 1986 American action drama Top Gun. The video opens with the titles "Will Young in Hot Gun", and features Young in the Tom Cruise fighter pilot role, playing beach volleyball and serenading a woman in a bar. In a 2005 interview with The Guardian, Young commented: "The video was the director Vaughan Arnell's idea – I'd had something different, a performance video, in mind. But he convinced me it was such a universal idea that covered so many areas – blokes love it, women like it. It's not in-your-face homoerotic. Homoeroticism should be subtle. It's not about dancing in leather pants. Mixed with humour, homoeroticism is fantastic."

Track listings

Notes
 denotes remix producer
"Switch It On" is based on the composition "Ho Diddley" as performed by Chitlin Circuitry.

Credits and personnel

Neil Conti – drums
Mark Feltham – harmonica
Luis Jardim – percussion
Stephen Lipson – producer, programming, writer
 Heff Moraes – engineer

Ronnie Peterson – writer 
Karen Poole – backing vocals, writer
 Mike Ross-Trevor – engineer
Steven Wolf – programming, writer 
Will Young – vocals, writer

Charts

Release history

References

External links
 "Switch It On" lyrics

Will Young songs
19 Recordings singles
2005 singles
Avant-pop songs
Music videos directed by Vaughan Arnell
Song recordings produced by Stephen Lipson
Songs written by Karen Poole
Songs written by Stephen Lipson
Songs written by Will Young
Sony BMG singles